The 2014 Osun State gubernatorial election occurred in Nigeria on 9 August 2014, the APC nominee Rauf Aregbesola won re-election, defeating Iyiola Omisore of the PDP.

Rauf Aregbesola emerged APC after he was returned as the sole candidate. He picked Titilayo Laoye-Tomori as his running mate. Iyiola Omisore was the PDP candidate with Adejare Bello as his running mate. 20 candidates contested in the election.

Electoral system
The Governor of Osun State is elected using the plurality voting system.

Primary election

APC primary
Rauf Aregbesola won the primary election after he emerged unopposed.

PDP primary
The PDP primary election was held on 5 April 2014. Iyiola Omisore won the primary election polling 1,128 votes against 3 other candidates. His closet rival was Olasunkanmi Akinlabi who scored 45 votes, Wole Oke scored 4 votes while Isiaka Adeleke withdrew.

Results
A total number of 20 candidates registered with the Independent National Electoral Commission to contest in the election.

A total number of 1,407,222  voters registered in the election.

By local government area
Here are the results of the election by local government area for the two major parties. 20 political parties participated in the election. Blue represents LGAs won by Rauf Aregbesola. Green represents LGAs won by Iyiola Omisore.

References 

Osun State gubernatorial election
Osun State gubernatorial election
Osun State gubernatorial election
Osun State gubernatorial elections